Charles Tweed may refer to:

 Charles Austin Tweed (1842–1918), American politician and jurist
 Charles H. Tweed (1895–1970), American orthodontist